The Revolutionary Mexicanist Action, better known as the Gold Shirts, a Mexican fascist, secular, anti-Semitic, anti-communist, ultra-nationalist paramilitary organization, originated in September 1933 in Mexico City and operated until disbanded in 1936. With ultra-nationalist, strikebreaking roots and Nazi German support, the organization sought to expel Chinese, Jews, and communists from Mexico. The organization often violently engaged with  labor movements associated with the Mexican Communist Party and with  labor strikers.

Nicolás Rodríguez Carrasco, a brigadier general under Pancho Villa in the 1910s during the Mexican Revolution, led the group during its most active period. Many founding members of the paramilitary had also been veterans of the Mexican Revolution of 1910-1920. Members were known as "the Gold Shirts", a name reminiscent of Villa's elite soldiers whom he referred to as "los dorados" (the golden ones).

Operating under the motto of "Mexico for Mexicans", the organization called for the expulsion of Jews and Chinese from Mexico. The Gold Shirts advocated the seizure of Chinese- and Jewish-owned  businesses. They also fiercely opposed labor movements and often clashed with members of the Mexican Communist Party. The group was very active in union busting, with the Gold Shirts instigating violent clashes with strikers.

The organization received financial support from the Nazi Party of Nazi Germany, from the National Fascist Party of Italy, and from Mexican industrialists such as Eugenio Garza Sada (1892-1973). The Gold Shirts also received political protection from ex-president Plutarco Elías Calles (in office 1924-1928), who vehemently opposed the  Cárdenas government (in office from 1934 to 1940).

History

Background (1920s-1933)

Anti-Chinese and Anti-Semitic sentiment 

At the start of the 1920s, racism in Mexico and xenophobic sentiments begun to intensify. Organizations such as the Pro-Race Committee and the Anti-Chinese and Anti-Jewish Nationalist League were created in response to a large influx of immigrants to Mexico. This was a result of growing economic concerns among the Mexican working and middle class. As Chinese-Mexicans, and Jews to a lesser extent, had come to constitute a considerable portion of the merchant class, many protests and boycotts against Chinese businesses were held. Mexican labor unions had put political pressure to restrict Chinese and Jewish immigration to Mexico.

The Mexican government, both state and federal, actively enacted and enforced discriminatory laws targeting people of Chinese descent. Following the Great Depression, Jews had become subject to the same type of persecution. Notably in May 1931 where 250 Jewish merchants were expelled from the La Lagunilla Market in Mexico City.

1930s Labor Strikes 
The government of President Pascual Ortiz Rubio faced intense political instability, exacerbated by the Great Depression. Droughts and floods heavily impeded agricultural production. By 1932, mass labor strikes in multiple industries were erupting throughout the country.

Plutarco Elías Calles wished to "keep workers under control" in response to the support Vicente Lombardo Toledano had been garnering among laborers. Ortiz Rubio would resign from the presidency in September 1932 as a result of Calles's influence and power in the government.

Green Shirts (1932) 
As the result of labor strikes and the support Toledano had garnered, Calles wished to protect the business interests of industrialists from strikers. Under the protection of a Callista official, if not Calles himself, Nicolás Rodríguez Carrasco founded the Green Shirts (Camisetas Verdes) in 1932. Rodríguez Carrasco had joined the Pro-Race Committee a year prior. The Green Shirts were a paramilitary group which was characterized as anti-communist, anti-union, ultranationalist. Calles politically protected and financially supported the group. The Green Shirts's campaigned under the mantra of "Mexico for Mexicans". As Calles began to lose power under Abelardo Rodríguez, the group was shortly dissolved by Rodríguez after taking power in September of that year.

Foundation and early years (1933-1935)

The Revolutionary Mexicanist Action was founded on September 25, 1933, within the Pro-Race Committee of the Federal District. The organization declared its fundamental objective was the moral and aggrandizement of Mexico, stating that their struggle "was not an offensive against foreigners but rather a defense of national interests."

The founders and early members were generals and other ex-military men. Prominent members included Nicolás Rodríguez Carrasco, Roque González Garza (instrumental figure during the Mexican Revolution and former acting President of Mexico),  Julio Madero González (brother of Francisco I. Madero and Gustavo A. Madero), Silvestre Terrazas (former Governor of Chihuahua), and Eduardo Dávila Garza (Head of the Mexican Catholic Apostolic Church). Other key members included Ovidio Pedrero Valenzuela and Andrés Morán.

Roque González Garza led the group for a few months from its foundation until Nicolás Rodríguez Carrasco assumed the position of supreme leader.

Organization & structure
Initially, organizing, directing messages, appointments, as well as basic tasks were all carried out by Rodriguez Carrasco. By May 1934, however, the ARM was divided into 15 zones. The zones were divided throughout the country but mainly in Mexico City. Each of these zones consisted of several groups of 10-15 individuals. Each group had a sub-chief who only reported to the zone chief who, in turn, would report to the supreme chief. By 1935, the ARM had 350 group leaders in the 15 zones. At this time, the organization had approximately 4000 members.

In the Mexico City chapter, there were a total of 377 members. Many members had been former military which included 14 generals, 7 lieutenant colonels, 13 colonels, 3 majors, 3 captains, 1 first sergeant, 1 lieutenant, a police chief, and a cop. General Vicente Gonzalez, chief of Mexico City's police force, was also in close contact with Rodriguez Carrasco.

1934 Leadership
The council of the Gold shirts were known as the Mesa Directiva.

By 1934, the organization had branches registered in: Villa Union, Mazatlan, Concordia, Culiacan, Saltillo, Torreon, Coahuila, Durango, Chiuahua, Juarez, Toluca, Monterrey, Nuevo León, Nuevo Laredo, Tamaulipas, Sabinas, Hidalgo, Puebla Texmelucan, Tehuacan, Guadalajara, Orizaba, Veracruz, Iguala Guerrero. Each of these chapters had leaders referred to as Chiefs.

Political pushback and Ban (1935-1936)

1935 Revolution Day Riot

Tensions between Calles and president Lázaro Cárdenas rose with the latter increasing the suppression efforts of the Gold Shirts. On November 20, 1935, a violent clash between communists and the Gold Shirts during the Revolution Day parade at the Zócalo resulted in 3 deaths and more than 40 injuries of which included Rodríguez Carrasco. Rodríguez Carrasco was stabbed twice in the abdomen and left critically injured.

The incident sparked nation-wide public outrage against the Revolutionary Mexicanist Actiontion. The Mexican senate sought to ban the organization a day after the riots.  Public protests were held against the group and their union busting activities with President Cárdenas receiving an overwhelming amount of requests to have the organization banned.

Disbandment (1936) 

In February 1936, the group participated in anti-communist rallies in Monterrey and in Puebla. The Monterrey rally was filmed by fascist film director and Gold Shirts supporter Gustavo Sáenz de Sicilia. Members of the ARM engaged in gunfire between police leaving 10 members dead. Following this incident, on February 27, 1936, Cárdenas ordered the dissolution of the group.

A few months later, Rodríguez was arrested for promoting "inter-labor conflicts" and deported to Texas in August 1936, from where he continued to lead the group until his death in 1940. They established a new center in Torréon after Rodríguez's expulsion. Gold Shirts toured the United States in 1937 and raised money from American supporters.

Exile (1936-1940)
Following the ban and expulsion of its leader, the Gold Shirts remained active and relocated their headquarters to Mission, Texas, where Rodríguez and his wife were located.

Beliefs 
Their motto was "Mexico for the Mexicans," a racialized or ethnic group that excluded Mexicans of Jewish or Chinese descent, and those who held anti-fascist political views, supported trade unions, or were communists or socialists. Rodríguez claimed that blood tests carried out by ethnographers showed that Mexicans and Nordic peoples were racially equal. They were fiercely antisemitic and Sinophobic: they demanded the removal of citizenship from and immediate deportation of Jews and Chinese from Mexico, with all their businesses turned over to "Mexicans."

Although the dorados copied their style from the Blackshirts and Sturmabteilung, the anti-communism and authoritarianism of the former and the anti-Semitism of the latter, they nonetheless lacked the fascist mission, being essentially, according to Fascism expert Stanley Payne, counterrevolutionary and reactionary, and as such were more easily employed by the existing state. John W. Sherman, an expert in Mexican right-wing organizations, describes them as "fascist" and "fascist-inspired," for their nationalistic, racist, and pro-business beliefs and activities.

Activities 
The Gold Shirts often violently clashed with supporters of the Mexican Communist Party and the Red Shirts, including a famous attack on a communist protest in 1935 in Mexico City. Three people died and over fifty were injured, including Rodríguez. They ransacked communist party offices on various occasions.

ARM members were often hired to intimidate workers or to prevent agrarian reform on haciendas. They attacked workers in Monterrey in 1936 as part of their anti-union activities.

In 1936, one night the Gold Shirts raided Jewish businesses, destroying them and attacking their owners. The protests in response were immediate, highlighting those of the US embassy, ​​the Mexican Communist Party and the International Red Aid. The general public described the event as a pogrom.

See also
 Camisas Rojas
 Gun politics in Mexico

References

External links
The opposition in the sixth cardenista (1934-1940) - The Mexican Revolutionary Action: The Golden Shirts

Paramilitary organizations based in Mexico
Fascism in Mexico
Antisemitism in Mexico
Anti-Chinese sentiment in North America
Clothing in politics
Mexican nationalism
Military units and formations established in 1933
1933 establishments in Mexico
Banned far-right parties
Fascist organizations
Anti-communist organizations